Best Model of Turkey is a female or male beauty competition. From 1988 to 1993, only Turkey's best female model was chosen in the competition. Since 1993, male models are also included. There were two exceptions: in 2004 when in addition to a male model, two female winners were selected; and in 2009, when the opposite happened and also two male models won.

Best Model of the World is a female or male beauty competition. From 1990 to 1995 Istanbul, Turkey, in 1990 with 44 countries participating.

Titleholders

By number of wins

Runner-Up

See also 

 List of beauty pageants

References

External links
 Best Model of the World Official website
 Best Model of the Turkey Official website 

 
Beauty pageants in Turkey
Annual events in Turkey
1988 establishments in Turkey
Turkish awards
Male beauty pageants
International beauty pageants